Ronald Sidney Maurice Reynolds (2 June 1928 – 2 June 1999) was an English goalkeeper whose career spanned nearly 20 years; he played 290 League games for three professional clubs, and for most of the 1950s played for Tottenham Hotspur, alongside his friend and tactical confidant, Danny Blanchflower.

Playing career

Aldershot
Reynolds was born in Haslemere and started his career at Aldershot as a 17–year old in 1945.

While a 22-year-old goalkeeper with Aldershot, Reynolds  wrote to Southampton asking for a trial but unfortunately Saints declined this offer and he instead went to White Hart Lane initially as the understudy to Ted Ditchburn.

Tottenham Hotspur
During his spell at Tottenham, Portsmouth had tried to sign him, but Reynolds was considered too valuable to be released and it wasn't until ten years after he had first contacted Southampton that Ted Bates, beating the transfer deadline by 24 hours, bought him from Spurs for £10,000. Reynolds played 138 first team games for Tottenham Hotspur including 86 League matches, 9 F.A. Cup the rest being Friendly, Tour and Representative games.

Southampton
Reynolds' composure and experience became a vital ingredient as Southampton went on to lift the Division 3 championship at the end of the 1959–1960 season.

Reynolds was in goal in a memorable match on 5 December 1960, in the League Cup round 4 at home to Leeds United – he went off after 19 minutes, injured when diving bravely at the feet of the Leeds centre-forward, John McCole. He was replaced in goal by Cliff Huxford who conceded four goals; fortunately for Southampton, Derek Reeves scored all five goals for the home side, who ran out 5–4 victors.

He broke his ankle in the first match of the 1961–62 season, at home to Plymouth Argyle on 19 August. He was replaced in goal, firstly by Terry Paine who let in 2 goals and was in turn replaced by Huxford. Reynolds took no further part in that season but fought his way back into the first team and was re-established as first choice keeper at the start of the next season.

Unfortunately, his career was terminated by a dislocated shoulder sustained at Fratton Park on 28 September 1963 – again Huxford took over in goal as substitutes were still not available.

Reynolds was one of the first professional footballers to have worn contact lenses.

Retirement
After his injury, Ron scouted briefly for Saints and Crystal Palace, before joining a firm of insurance brokers in 1964. He later set up his own brokers business in Haslemere.

Memorabilia
He died on his 71st birthday (2 June 1999), and upon clearing out his house his family discovered a meticulously kept archive of Reynolds' professional career - cupboards, shoeboxes and carrier bags full of notebooks, programmes, ticket stubs, press cuttings, photographs, souvenirs from foreign tours and Reynolds' own match reports of all his games.

He had gathered a collection of memorabilia providing a rare insight into the world of the 1950s footballer. It was the era of the maximum wage, a time when players could not leave their club without the express say-so of their bosses; employers had a serfs and masters mentality, which was famously described as 'soccer slavery' by Jimmy Hill.

Reynolds himself was quite a character - fastidious and outspoken he was a formidable PFA (Professional Footballers' Association) representative and was behind many of the perceived insurrections of his more famous soul-mate Danny Blanchflower, with whom he shared a passion for the glory of the game. His strength of character made him a natural champion of employee's rights, but this sense of purpose was also ideal in his career as a goalkeeper.

In 2003, his son, David, published a collection of his late father's memoirs.
 
In the book he reports an incident of "tapping-up" – whilst at Southampton, he was astonished to be contacted by the great Alf Ramsey over a possible transfer to Ipswich Town.

References

External links
Photo of Ron Reynolds in action at Charlton in 1963

1928 births
1999 deaths
People from Haslemere
English footballers
Association football goalkeepers
Aldershot F.C. players
Southampton F.C. players
Tottenham Hotspur F.C. players
London XI players
English Football League players